Vasily Dmitriyevich Sovpel (born 20 March 1999) is a Belarusian professional footballer who plays for Kaisar.

Honours
Gomel
Belarusian Cup winner: 2021–22

References

External links 
 
 

1999 births
Living people
Belarusian footballers
Association football midfielders
Belarusian expatriate footballers
Expatriate footballers in Uzbekistan
Expatriate footballers in Kazakhstan
FC Dinamo Minsk players
FC Chist players
FC Energetik-BGU Minsk players
FK Andijon players
FC Gomel players
FC Kaisar players